
Gmina Milejczyce is a rural gmina (administrative district) in Siemiatycze County, Podlaskie Voivodeship, in north-eastern Poland.

Villages
Gmina Milejczyce contains the villages and settlements of Biełki, Borowiki, Chańki, Choroszczewo, Choroszczewo-Kolonia, Gołubowszczyzna, Grabarka, Jałtuszczyki, Klimkowicze, Lewosze, Lubiejki, Miedwieżyki, Mikulicze, Milejczyce, Nowosiółki, Osinki, Pokaniewo, Pokaniewo-Kolonia, Rogacze and Sobiatyno.

Neighbouring gminas
Gmina Milejczyce is bordered by the gminas of Boćki, Czeremcha, Dziadkowice, Kleszczele and Nurzec-Stacja.

References
 Polish official population figures 2006

Milejczyce
Siemiatycze County